The 2005 Kansas Jayhawks football team played in the Big 12 Conference representing the University of Kansas. The Jayhawks, members of the Big 12 Conference, were coached by Mark Mangino in his fourth season as head coach. The Jayhawks defeated Nebraska for the first time in 37 years after beating them 40–15. They finished the regular season 6–5 becoming eligible for a bowl game for the second time in three seasons.  The Jayhawks won the Fort Worth Bowl, defeating the Houston Cougars, 42–13, which was their first bowl game victory in 10 years.

Schedule

References

Kansas
Kansas Jayhawks football seasons
Armed Forces Bowl champion seasons
Kansas Jayhawks football